Pitcairnia wendlandii is a flowering plant in the Bromeliaceae family. It is native to Costa Rica, Panama, Honduras, Guatemala and Chiapas.

References

wendlandii
Flora of Chiapas
Flora of Central America
Plants described in 1853
Taxa named by John Gilbert Baker